The 2019  Cleveland Open was a professional tennis tournament played on hard courts. It was the first edition of the tournament which was part of the 2019 ATP Challenger Tour. It took place in Cleveland, United States between 28 January and 3 February 2019.

Singles main-draw entrants

Seeds

 1 Rankings are as of 14 January 2019.

Other entrants
The following players received wildcards into the singles main draw:
  Felix Corwin
  Michael Redlicki
  Noah Rubin
  Ryan Shane
  J. J. Wolf

The following players received entry into the singles main draw using their ITF World Tennis Ranking:
  Gijs Brouwer
  Matías Franco Descotte
  Tom Jomby
  Louis Wessels

The following players received entry from the qualifying draw:
  Maxime Cressy
  Jared Hiltzik

The following player received entry as a lucky loser:
  Gonzalo Escobar

Champions

Singles

 Maxime Cressy def.  Mikael Torpegaard 6–7(4–7), 7–6(8–6), 6–3.

Doubles

 Romain Arneodo /  Andrei Vasilevski def.  Robert Galloway /  Nathaniel Lammons 6–4, 7–6(7–4).

2019 ATP Challenger Tour
2019 in American tennis
January 2019 sports events in the United States
February 2019 sports events in the United States
2010s in Cleveland
Tennis in Cleveland